Scoliciosporum abietinum is a species of crustose lichen in the family Scoliciosporaceae, first found in inland rainforests of British Columbia.

References

Lecanorales
Lichen species
Lichens of Western Canada
Lichens described in 2009
Taxa named by Toby Spribille
Fungi without expected TNC conservation status